Geoff Cook (29 June 1910 – 12 September 1982) was an Australian cricketer. He played in 68 first-class matches for Queensland between 1931 and 1948.

See also
 List of Queensland first-class cricketers

References

External links
 

1910 births
1982 deaths
Australian cricketers
Queensland cricketers
Cricketers from Brisbane